Bushnell University is a private Christian university in Eugene, Oregon. It is historically affiliated with the Christian Church (Disciples of Christ) and the Christian churches and churches of Christ.

History 

The school was founded  as a divinity school in 1895 by Disciple of Christ preacher and educator Eugene Claremont Sanderson as the Eugene Divinity School (EDS).  In 1908 it became Eugene Bible University; in 1930 that name changed to Eugene Bible College. After a merger with Spokane University in 1934, it became known as Northwest Christian College and then Northwest Christian University in 2008. In 2020, it formally changed its named to Bushnell University, after James A. Bushnell, the first chairman of the university's board of trustees.

On December 8, 2009, Joseph Womack was named as Bushnell University's 10th president, taking office on June 1, 2010. Womack is the son of Bushnell's eighth president, James Womack, who served from 1986 to 2004.

Presidents 
Eugene C. Sanderson, 1895–1929
S. Earl Childers, 1929–1934
Victor P. Morris, Acting, 1934–1936 & 1943–1944
Kendall E. Burke, 1936–1943
Ross J. Griffeth, 1944–1965
Barton A. Dowdy, 1965–1978
William E. Hays, 1978–1985
H. Charles Pyron, Interim, 1985–1986
James E. Womack, 1986–2004
David W. Wilson, 2004–2010
Joseph D. Womack, 2010–present

Academics 
Bushnell University is organized into seven schools: Arts & Sciences, Bible & World Christianity, Business, Leadership & Teachnology, Education, Music & Performing Arts, Nursing, and Psychology & Counseling.

Accreditation and affiliations 
Bushnell University is accredited by the Northwest Commission on Colleges and Universities. It is a member of the Oregon Alliance of Independent Colleges and Universities (OAICU), the Council for Christian Colleges and Universities (CCCU), and the Council on Undergraduate Research (CUR). The education programs are approved by the Oregon Teacher Standards and Practices Commission (TSPC), the business programs are accredited by the International Assembly of Collegiate Business Education (IACBE), and the Clinical Mental Health Counseling programs is accredited by the Council for Accreditation of Counseling and Related Educational Programs.

Campus 
Bushnell University is located in east Eugene, at the corner of Alder Street and E. 11th Avenue, separated from the larger University of Oregon by the width of a single lane street. Founder Eugene Sanderson envisioned a school at which students would study the Bible and principles of Christian ministry under Eugene Divinity School's faculty, but take other subjects on the neighboring campus, a model he also attempted to set up at Manhattan Christian College, located near Kansas State University. The Eugene Divinity School and its successive institutions maintained this arrangement with the University of Oregon until 1995, when the University of Oregon unilaterally discontinued it. Since that time Bushnell has grown to become a comprehensive liberal arts college. Today, Bushnell students occasionally take University of Oregon classes, have checkout privileges from Knight Library, and take advantage of lectures and other events on the neighboring campus.

Athletics 
The Bushnell athletic teams are called the Beacons. The university is a member of the National Association of Intercollegiate Athletics (NAIA), primarily competing in the Cascade Collegiate Conference (CCC) since the 2007–08 academic year; which they were a member on a previous stint during the 2006–07 school year as an associate member for women's volleyball and softball. The Beacons previously competed as an NAIA Independent from 2005–06 to 2006–07.

Bushnell competes in 16 intercollegiate varsity sports: Men's sports include baseball, basketball, cross country, eSports, golf, soccer and track & field; while women's sports include basketball, beach volleyball, cross country, eSports, golf, soccer, softball, track & field and volleyball.

Baseball 
In January 2021, the university announced a plan to revive its baseball program after a more than 50-year hiatus as the school's 17th varsity sport offering, and named Tommy Richards, a former Baltimore Orioles' prospect and Whitman College Assistant, as the program's new head coach.

Cross country 
During the fall of 2015 the woman's cross country team won first place in the NAIA Cross Country National Championship in Charlotte, North Carolina. This was the first time Bushnell University's (then known as Northwest Christian) cross country team won first place in this championship. The seven runners who competed at the meet were, Melissa Rios (Freshman), Rosa Schmidt (Sophomore), Shea Vallaire, (Junior), Michelle Fletcher, (Junior), Macie Gale, (Junior), and Alyssa Harmon (Junior).

Other sports 
In 2018, Bailey Dell won the NAIA national championship in women's javelin. In 2019, Anika Rasubala won the NAIA national championship in women's steeplechase.

Notable alumni 
Mary Burrows, politician
David Ray Griffin, process theologian and retired professor of theology at Claremont School of Theology
Bruce Hanna, politician
Kylor Kelley, (attended, did not graduate), basketball player
Mickey Loomis, general manager of the New Orleans Saints (NFL)
E. R. Moon, class of 1903, Christian missionary to the Belgian Congo from 1908 to 1923 as well as Jamaica from 1938 to 1944
Frank Morse, class of 1966, president of Morse Brothers construction company and Oregon state senator from 2003 to 2012
Mike Petersen, basketball coach, assistant coach of the Atlanta Dream (WNBA)
Ryan Stevenson, singer
Paul Wright, lead singer of Rootdown

References

External links 
 Official website
 Official athletics website

 
Buildings and structures in Eugene, Oregon
Council for Christian Colleges and Universities
Education in Eugene, Oregon
Educational institutions established in 1894
Universities and colleges accredited by the Northwest Commission on Colleges and Universities
Universities and colleges affiliated with the Christian Church (Disciples of Christ)
Universities and colleges affiliated with the Christian churches and churches of Christ
Private universities and colleges in Oregon
1895 establishments in Oregon
Cascade Collegiate Conference